Cercopithecine alphaherpesvirus 2 (CeHV-2) is a species of virus in the genus Simplexvirus, subfamily Alphaherpesvirinae, family Herpesviridae, and order Herpesvirales.

References

External links
 

Alphaherpesvirinae